The 1994 Kansas City Royals season  was a season in American baseball. It involved the Royals finishing 3rd in the American League Central with a record of 64 wins and 51 losses. The season was cut short by the 1994 player's strike. The season marked the Royals' alignment into the new American League Central division.

Offseason
December 16, 1993: Gary Gaetti signed as a free agent with the Kansas City Royals.
January 5, 1994: Kevin McReynolds was traded by the Kansas City Royals to the New York Mets for Vince Coleman and cash.
January 27, 1994: Steve Balboni was signed as a free agent with the Kansas City Royals.
January 27, 1994: Dave Henderson was signed as a free agent with the Kansas City Royals.

Regular season

Thanks to the pitching prowess of Kevin Appier, Tom Gordon and 1994 AL Cy Young Award winner David Cone, and the hitting power of AL Rookie of the Year Bob Hamelin, the Royals had compiled a 64-51 record through 115 games. They had scored 574 runs (4.99 per game) and allowed 532 runs (4.63 per game). The Royals were in the thick of the 1994 AL Wildcard race, trailing the Baltimore Orioles by  a game and the Cleveland Indians by 3 games.

Royals' pitchers struggled with control during the regular season, as they combined for 60 wild pitches (the most in the Majors) through the Royals' 115 games. Royals hitters were very active on the basepaths, as they led the Majors in stolen bases, with 140, and times caught stealing, with 62.

Opening Day starters
Vince Coleman
Brian McRae
Wally Joyner
Mike Macfarlane
Gary Gaetti
Bob Hamelin
Dave Henderson
Greg Gagne
Jose Lind

Season standings

Record vs. opponents

Transactions
June 2, 1994: Matt Treanor was drafted by the Kansas City Royals in the 4th round of the 1994 amateur draft. Player signed June 4, 1994.
 July 18, 1994: Mike Jeffcoat was signed as a free agent with the Kansas City Royals.
 August 5, 1994: Mike Jeffcoat was released by the Kansas City Royals.

Roster

Player stats

Batting

Starters by position
Note: Pos = Position; G = Games played; AB = At bats; R = Runs; H = Hits;  HR = Home runs; RBI = Runs batted in; Avg. = Batting average; SB = Stolen bases

Other batters
Note: G = Games played; AB = At bats; R = Runs; H = Hits; HR = Home runs; RBI = Runs batted in; Avg. = Batting average; SB = Stolen bases

Pitching

Starting pitchers 
Note: G = Games pitched; IP = Innings pitched; W = Wins; L = Losses; ERA = Earned run average; SO = Strikeouts

Relief pitchers 
Note: G = Games pitched; IP = Innings pitched; W = Wins; L = Losses; SV = Saves; ERA = Earned run average; SO = Strikeouts

Awards and honors
Cy Young Award
David Cone, Kansas City Royals (AL)
Rookie of the Year
Bob Hamelin, Kansas City Royals (AL)

Farm system 

LEAGUE CHAMPIONS: Wilmington

References

1994 Kansas City Royals at Baseball Reference
1994 Kansas City Royals at Baseball Almanac

Kansas City Royals seasons
Kansas
Kansas City Royals